Centipede Horror, also known as Centipede Curse, is a 1981 Hong Kong horror film directed by Keith Li. It stars Michael Miu as Pak, who, along with his friend Chee (Tien-Lang Li), visits Singapore to investigate the death of Pak's sister Kay (Lai Fun Chan). They soon learn that Kay fell victim to the powerful "centipede spell", and find themselves threatened by a magician who seeks revenge for a crime committed by their grandfather years prior.

Cast
 Michael Miu as Pak
 Tien-Lang Li as Chee
 Lai Fun Chan as Kay

Home media
In April 2020, a restoration of the film by the American Genre Film Archive (AGFA) sourced from a 35 mm film print was made available to rent on video-on-demand (VOD). In 2022, a 2K restoration of the film was released on Blu-ray by Error_4444, a label that distributes Asian films. Prior to these releases, Centipede Horror had not received an official home media release in the United States, though bootlegged copies did exist.

References

External links
 
 Centipede Horror at the Hong Kong Movie Database

Hong Kong supernatural horror films
1981 films
1981 horror films
1980s supernatural horror films
Films about magic and magicians
Films about arthropods
1980s Hong Kong films